This is a list of video games for the Super Nintendo Entertainment System (SNES) video game console, known as the Super Famicom (SFC) in Japan, that have sold or shipped at least one million copies. The best-selling game on the SNES is Super Mario World. First released in Japan on November 21, 1990, it went on to sell over 20million units worldwide. The second Super Mario game on the SNES, Super Mario All-Stars, is the second-best-selling game on the platform, with sales in excess of 10.5million units. The console's top five is rounded out by Rare's Donkey Kong Country in third, with sales of 9.3million units, while its two follow-ups are also in the top ten, Super Mario Kart in fourth, selling over 8.7million units, and Street Fighter II: The World Warrior in fifth, with 6.3million units sold.

There are a total of 50 SNES/Super Famicom games on this list which are confirmed to have sold or shipped at least one million units. Of these, twelve were developed by internal Nintendo development divisions. Other developers with the most million-selling games include Capcom and Square, with nine games each in the list of 50. Of the 50 games on this list, 20 were published in one or more regions by Nintendo. Other publishers with multiple million-selling games include Capcom with nine games, Square with eight games, Enix with five games, and Acclaim Entertainment with three games. The most popular franchises on SNES include Super Mario (46.18million combined units), Donkey Kong (17.96million combined units), and Street Fighter (12.4million combined units).

List

Notes

References

External links
 Nintendo official homepage

Super Nintendo Entertainment System
Best-selling Super Nintendo Entertainment System video games